Smena is a series of low-cost 35 mm film cameras manufactured in the Soviet Union by the LOMO factory from 1953 to 1991. They were designed to be inexpensive and accessible to the public, made of bakelite or black plastic for the later models.

Their mode of operation was exclusively manual, to the extent that winding of film is separated from shutter cocking.

In the 1960s and 1970s they were exported by Soviet era export conglomerate Mashpriborintorg. Austrian company Lomographische AG now promotes Smenas, as exclusive distributor  under agreement with LOMO PLC.

Specifications

Smena 8M
 Lens: Triplet 43, 40 mm, f/4, 3 elements
 Focal range: 1 m to infinity, scale-focus
 Shutter speeds : B, 1/15, 1/30, 1/60, 1/125, 1/250
 Shutter type: 3 blades diaphragm shutter
 Apertures: f/4, f/5.6, f/8, f/11, f/16
 Film type: 35 mm film
 Size: 70 x 100 x 60 mm
 Weight: 289 g

Models
The Smena models are:
Smena
Smena-2
Smena-2M
Smena-3
Smena-4
Smena-5
Smena-6
Smena-7
Smena-8 or Cosmic 35 for the UK market.
Smena-8M
Smena-9
Smena-35
Smena-Rapid
Smena-Symbol
Smena-M
Smena-Sl

Model gallery

See also
 Lubitel
 Lomography

Citations

External links

 Smena page on the Lomography website
We use film Smena 1- Specifications and pics
weusefilm – smena 8 /  cosmic – Manual & Specifications
 Few images taken with Smena Cosmic

Cameras
Soviet cameras
Toy Cameras